Bye is an English, Norwegian, and Swedish surname. Variations of the surname include By and Buy, among others.  The English surname is derived from Middle English bye "bend" (from Old English byge, a derivative of bugan "to bow"). The Norwegian and Swedish surname is derived from a habitational name from any of various farms named By, from Old Norse býr "farm."

Notable people with the surname include:

Alfred Bye (1899–1941), Australian murderer
Bendik Bye (born 1990), Norwegian footballer
Beth Bye, American politician
Brandon Bye (born 1995), American soccer player
Brian Bye (born 1954), Canadian ice hockey player
Chris Bye (disambiguation), multiple people
Ed Bye (born 1955), English TV producer and director
Eirik Bye (born 1995), Norwegian skier
James Bye (actor) (born 1984), English actor
James Bye (footballer) (1920–1995), English footballer
Kermit Edward Bye (1937–2021), American judge
Matti Bye (born 1966), Swedish pianist and composer
Nicholas Bye (born 1960), English politician
Oskar Bye (1870–1939), Norwegian gymnast
Robert Bye (1889–1962), Welsh army sergeant
Ronald Bye (1937–2018), Norwegian politician
John By(1779-1836), founder of the Canadian capital, Ottawa

English-language surnames
Norwegian-language surnames
Swedish-language surnames